Kaizokuban Bootleg Film is a 1999 Japanese drama film directed by Masahiro Kobayashi. It was screened in the Un Certain Regard section at the 1999 Cannes Film Festival.

Cast
 Akira Emoto - Tatsuo
 Kippei Shiina - Seiji
 Maika - Junko
 Wakaba Nakano - Reiko
 Kazue Takani - Akiko
 Tamaki - Ayako
 Kazuki Kitamura - Yoji

References

External links

1999 films
1990s Japanese-language films
1999 drama films
Films directed by Kobayashi Masahiro
Japanese black-and-white films
1990s Japanese films